In plant morphology, a cataphyll (sometimes also called a cataphyllum or cataphyll leaf) is a reduced, small leaf. Many plants have both "true leaves" (euphylls), which perform most of the photosynthesis, and cataphylls, which are modified to perform other functions.

Cataphylls include bracts, bracteoles and bud scales, as well as any small leaves that resemble scales, known as scale leaves. The functions of cataphylls, such as bud scales, may be short-lived, and they are often shed after their function is fulfilled.

Etymology

Forms 
In some cases, cataphylls perform a transient function, after which they die and may shed. Those that shed early are said to be caducous. The sepals of Papaver species are shed during the very opening of the petals and are a dramatic example of caducous leaves. 

Cataphylls can have many other forms. Some, such as spines, corm-scales, and bud-scales, may be persistent but may not perform their major function until they die, whether or not they are physically shed. Examples of various kinds of living cataphylls include bulb-scales, rhizome-scales, cotyledons, and scaly bracts. Several of these occur in various forms and contexts. For example, bud scales occur on numerous kinds of leaf or branch buds, as well as on flower buds.

Protective masses of dead leaves encircle the stems of some species of palm trees or aloes, but those are not usually regarded as cataphylls because their primary function while alive is photosynthesis.

Cotyledons as cataphylls
Cotyledons are widely regarded as a class of cataphyll, though many kinds of cotyledons function as living tissue and remain alive until, at least, the end of their function, at which time they wither and may drop off. They begin as leaf rudiments. Many kinds accumulate nutrient materials for storage, starting to give up their stored material as the plant germinates. Some, such as the cotyledons of many legumes, conifers, and cucurbits, develop chlorophyll and perform the first photosynthesis for the germinating plant.

Corm scales
Like bulb-scales, corm scales are largely the basal parts of the photosynthetic leaves that show up above ground. Some species of cormous plants, such as some Lapeirousia, also produce cataphylls that act solely as tunic leaves for the corm. Unlike bulb-scales, however, the corm tunic has no significant storage function; that task is left to the Parenchyma of the cortex of the corm.

See also
 Leaf shape
 Leaf size

References 

Plant morphology